"Carefree" is a football chant, sung by followers of the Chelsea football club, mainly at away games, and meant to demonstrate indifference and possibly belligerence when in an alien, hostile environment. The original tune is "Lord of the Dance”.

Lyrics

The chant was first sung by Chesterfield FC supporters, who were singing the chant during their Anglo-Scottish Cup winning season in 1981. Chelsea adopted the song on a trip of fans to an away game in Sweden, ca. 1982. The lyrics were probably put together by a terrace regular named Mick Greenaway. who had become aware of the Chesterfield  FC chant.  

Carefree, wherever we may be
We are the famous CFC
And we don't give a f*ck
Whoever you may be
'Cause we are the famous CFC

Usually, the chant is sung with bawdier lyrics.

References

External links
Video of fans singing "Carefree"
Official CFC website

Chelsea F.C. songs
Football songs and chants